Stephanie Kunze is an American politician serving as a member of the Ohio Senate for the 16th district. She formerly served in the Ohio House of Representatives for the 24th district. Prior to her election, she was a member of Hilliard City Council and a secretary at Norwich Elementary School.

Career 
In her 2009 race for Hilliard City Council, Kunze faced controversy over an apparent violation of Ohio law that prohibits classified public employees from participating in partisan primary elections. She resigned her position with the school district after winning the Republican primary.

She was elected to the Ohio House of Representatives in 2012, defeating Democrat Maureen Reedy with 52% of the vote. Kunze's 2012 campaign was aided by school privatization and charter school advocacy group StudentsFirst, who sent mailers and distributed literature on her behalf.

Kunze ran for re-election as a State Representative in 2014, facing opposition from Democrat Kathy Hoff and Libertarian Mark M. Noble. In 2016, Kunze opted to run for the Ohio Senate, winning with 58% of the vote.

Personal life 
She is married with two children.

Electoral history

References

Living people
Republican Party members of the Ohio House of Representatives
Indiana University alumni
Year of birth missing (living people)
Women state legislators in Ohio
Candidates in the 2021 United States elections
21st-century American politicians
21st-century American women politicians
Republican Party Ohio state senators
People from Hilliard, Ohio